The Ruth Bancroft Garden is a  public dry garden established by Ruth Bancroft. It contains more than 2,000 cactus, succulents, trees, and shrubs native to California, Mexico, Chile, South Africa, and Australia. It is located at 1552 Bancroft Road in Walnut Creek, California, USA.

History

The Garden began in the early 1950s as Ruth Bancroft's private collection of potted plants within Bancroft Farm, a  property bought by publisher Hubert Howe Bancroft (grandfather of Ruth's husband Philip) in the 1880s as an orchard for pears and walnuts. In the 1950s, Bancroft brought home a single succulent, an Aeonium grown by plant breeder Glenn Davidson. By 1972, the collection was moved to its current site, when the orchard was cut down and the land was rezoned.

In 1989, it became the first garden in the United States to be preserved by The Garden Conservancy, and has been open to the public since 1992. Today the Garden is an outstanding landscape of xerophytes (dry-growing plants). It is open to the public for an admission fee of  $810.

Collection

Garden collections include the following plants:
Aeoniums
Aloes
Agavoideae
Brachychiton trees including Brachychiton rupestris
Brahea palms including Brahea armata
Bromeliaceae-Bromeliads including Dyckias, Hechtias, and Puyas (including Puya chilensis)
Butia palms
Dasylirions including Dasylirion longissimum and Dasylirion wheeleri
Dudleyas
Echeverias
Echinocacti
Furcraeas including Furcraea cabuya
Hesperaloes including Hesperaloe parviflora
Hesperoyuccas including Hesperoyucca whipplei
Jubaea chilenensis palms
Nolinas; Xanthorrhoeas including Xanthorrhoea preissii
Yuccas including Yucca filamentosa, Yucca gloriosa, and Yucca rostrata

References and external links

See also

List of botanical gardens and arboretums in California
List of botanical gardens in the United States

External links

Official website
The Garden Conservancy

Botanical gardens in California
Gardens in California
Walnut Creek, California
Protected areas of Contra Costa County, California
Landscape design history of the United States